The Hot Chick is a 2002 American teen comedy film written and directed by Tom Brady, with additional writing by Rob Schneider. Schneider stars as Clive Maxtone, a middle-aged criminal who switches bodies with mean-spirited cheerleader Jessica Spencer, played by Rachel McAdams. Anna Faris stars as Jessica's best friend, April, and Matthew Lawrence plays Jessica's steady boyfriend. 

Adam Sandler served as executive producer and has a small role in the film as the Mambuza Bongo Player, a character based on one played by Schneider in a Saturday Night Live sketch. Sisters Tia and Tamera Mowry and singers Ashlee Simpson, Angie Stone, and Michelle Branch also had small roles. Parts of the film were shot at Redondo Union High School and El Segundo High School.

Plot
In 50 BC, in an Abyssinian castle, the princess Nawa uses a pair of enchanted earrings to escape an arranged marriage by swapping bodies with a slave girl. When each woman wears one of the earrings, their bodies are magically swapped while their minds remain in place.

In her modern-day suburban home, Jessica Spencer is a beautiful but selfish "hot chick". Her closest friends are April, Keecia, and Lulu. April is Jessica's best friend, and all four girls are cheerleaders. At school one day, Jessica makes fun of an overweight girl named Hildenburg and a Wiccan girl named Eden. After that, she and her friends visit the local mall, where Jessica gets her rival Bianca into trouble and finds the earrings in an African-themed store. The earrings are not for sale, so Jessica steals them.

Shortly afterward, small-time criminal Clive Maxtone robs a nearby gas station. When Jessica and her friends stop there and mistake him for an employee, he services their car to avoid raising suspicion. She accidentally drops one of the earrings on the ground, the girls drive away, and Clive picks up the earring. That evening, in their respective homes, Jessica and Clive put on their earrings. When they wake up the next morning, each of them is trapped in the other's body. This is especially difficult for Jessica, who has a cheering competition and the school prom coming up soon.

After Jessica convinces her friends of who she is, they help her investigate the body swap. Hildenburg, Eden, and Bianca are all innocent, Hildenburg and Eden join Jessica after she apologizes to them, and Eden finds a picture of the earrings on the internet. When the girls return to the African store, the owner explains how the earrings work and tells the girls they must find the other earring soon or the change will become permanent.

Meanwhile, Jessica is hired for two jobs while secretly living with April. At her own home, where she works as a gardener, her parents tell her about their marital problems and she helps them rekindle their sex life. 

At school, while cleaning the boys' locker room as a custodian, she spies on her boyfriend Billy, who truly loves her, and April's boyfriend Jake, who has been cheating on her. Faced with Jake's infidelity, April begins to fall in love with Jessica, who agrees to take her to the prom. 

At the cheering competition, Jessica signals romantically to Billy while disguised as the school mascot, but when the head of her suit falls off, he becomes confused and leaves with Bianca. 

Jessica goes to the prom with April and they kiss. Jake sees this and is so upset, he spills his drink on his date. April confesses to being in love with Jessica, who tells April she is perfect and doesn't need anybody. Jessica tries to win Billy back, telling Billy it's her in Clive's body, but he is so shocked and confused that he runs off. 

During this time, Clive has been using Jessica's body to make money from men, including Billy, who gives him his money and car, believing he is Jessica. Clive then tries to run him over. On the evening of the prom, Hildenburg sees a video of Clive in Jessica's body robbing a man on the TV news, goes to the scene of the crime, and finds a business card for the club where Clive works as a pole dancer. She informs Jessica at the prom, and the girls go to the club. 

When they find Clive, Jessica steals his earring and puts it on herself along with the other one. With both earrings now on the same person, Jessica's and Clive's bodies return to their original owners.

After Jessica makes up with Billy, the film ends with the school's graduation ceremony, followed by a scene in which Clive, running from the law and still dressed in lingerie, is picked up by a bartender who believes he is a homosexual. The bartender turns around slowly with a sinister smile on his face to look at Clive, and Clive screams in horror.

Cast

Wes Takahashi, former animator and visual effects supervisor for Industrial Light & Magic, makes a cameo appearance as a news reporter. Schneider's mother Pilar appears as a judge of the cheerleading contest.

Production
Filming took place at University High School in West Los Angeles. Speaking on the film, Schneider commented: "No man is a hundred-percent masculine and no woman is a hundred-percent feminine – we're all just somewhere on the scale there. So what I tried to do was just play it with an innocence and gentleness, and then find some physical keys to lock-in on."

Casting
Singers Ashlee Simpson and Michelle Branch each make their feature film debut with cameo roles.

Soundtrack

Release
The Hot Chick was originally rated R, but several scenes were edited out in order to receive the broader PG-13 rating. The R version was classified 12A in Britain, maintaining the same rating given to the PG-13 theatrical version.

Before the film was released theatrically, previews indicated the title would be Miss Popularity.

Reception

Box office
The film opened at #5 at the U.S. box office on the weekend of December 13–15, 2002, taking in US$7,401,146, averaging $3,338 across the 2,217 theatres where it was shown. It went on to earn a total worldwide gross of $54,639,553.

Critical response
The film received negative reviews. On Rotten Tomatoes, the film had an approval rating of 21% based on reviews from 82 critics, with an average score of 3.90/10. The critical consensus read: "The Hot Chick'''s one-note concept gets stretched thin, and a lot of the jokes fall flat." On Metacritic, as of October 2020, the film had a score of 29 out 100 based on reviews from 22 critics, indicating "generally unfavorable reviews". Audiences surveyed by CinemaScore gave the film a grade B+ on scale of A to F.

Roger Ebert and Richard Roeper gave the film two thumbs way down. Ebert gave the film half a star (out of a possible four), declaring, "The MPAA rates this PG-13. It is too vulgar for anyone under 13, and too dumb for anyone over 13." Roeper panned the film saying "it's in color. And, it was mostly in focus."

Dennis Harvey of Variety magazine wrote: "At best routinely assembled—at worst barely competent. The slapstick is labored, and the bigger setpieces flat."

 Accolades 
 
Rob Schneider was nominated for a Razzie Award for Worst Actor of the Decade for his performance in the film.

Home media  The Hot Chick was released May 13, 2003 on VHS and DVD. The DVD featured the deleted scenes that would have made the film an R, including an alternate ending.

See also
 Freaky Friday  (1976)
 Big'' (1988)
 Body swaps in films

References

External links

 
 

2002 films
2000s buddy comedy films
2000s crime comedy films
2000s fantasy comedy films
2000s high school films
2000s sex comedy films
2000s teen comedy films
American crime comedy films
American fantasy comedy films
American female buddy films
American high school films
American sex comedy films
American teen comedy films
Body swapping in films
Cheerleading films
2000s English-language films
Films about proms
Films set in shopping malls
Films directed by Tom Brady
Films scored by John Debney
Films shot in Los Angeles
Happy Madison Productions films
Robbery in fiction
Films with screenplays by Rob Schneider
2000s teen fantasy films
Touchstone Pictures films
2002 directorial debut films
2002 comedy films
2000s American films